Robert Farrar Capon (October 26, 1925 – September 5, 2013) was an American Episcopal priest, author and chef.

He was born in Jackson Heights, Queens in 1925 and graduated from Columbia College in 1946 and Columbia Graduate School of Arts and Sciences in 1947. A lifelong New Yorker, for almost thirty years Capon was a full-time parish priest in Port Jefferson, New York. In 1965, he published his first book, Bed and Board.

In 1977 the 51 year-old Capon was relieved of his parish duties after he revealed his intent to divorce his wife and remarry.  He left the full-time ministry and devoted more time to his writing career. He authored a total of twenty books, including Between Noon and Three, The Supper of the Lamb,  Genesis: The Movie, and a trilogy on Jesus’ parables: The Parables of Grace, The Parables of the Kingdom, and The Parables of Judgment.

Capon described himself in the introduction to one of his books as an “old-fashioned high churchman and a Thomist to boot.”  One of Capon's primary themes is the radical grace of God.  Capon summarizes his broad view of salvation as follows:

In the 1990s Capon served as assisting priest at St. Luke's Church in East Hampton, New York, and was the Canon Theologian to the Episcopal Bishop of Long Island.  He lived with his wife Valerie in Shelter Island, New York as of 2004.

Capon also had a lifelong interest in food and cooking, and authored several cookbooks. He was a food columnist for Newsday and The New York Times, and taught cooking classes.

Robert Capon died on September 5, 2013, in Greenport, New York. He was survived by his second wife Valerie and his eight children.

Bibliography
 Light Theology and Heavy Cream: The Culinary Adventures of Pietro and Madeline (2004)
 Genesis, The Movie (2003)
 Kingdom, Grace, Judgment (2002)
 The Fingerprints of God (2000)
 The Foolishness of Preaching (1997)
 Between Noon and Three: Romance, Law, and the Outrage of Grace (1997)
 The Astonished Heart (1996)
 The Romance of the Word (1995)
 Health, Money, and Love . . . And Why We Don't Enjoy Them (1994)
 The Mystery of Christ . . . and Why We Don't Get It (1993)
 The Man Who Met God in a Bar: The Gospel According to Marvin : A Novel (1990)
 The Parables of Judgment (1989)
 The Parables of Grace (1988)
 The Third Peacock: The Problem of God and Evil (1986)
 The Parables of the Kingdom (1985)
 The Youngest Day (1983)
 A Second Day: Reflections on Remarriage (1980)
 Party Spirit: Some Entertaining Principles (1979)
 Food for Thought: Resurrecting the Art of Eating (1978)
 Hunting the Divine Fox: Images and Mystery in Christian Faith (1977)
 Exit 36: A Fictional Chronicle (1975)
 The Supper of the Lamb: A Culinary Reflection (1969)
 An Offering of Uncles: The Priesthood of Adam and the Shape of the World (1967)
 Bed and Board: Plain Talk About Marriage (1965)

References

External links
Interview
Bio

American food writers
American Episcopal theologians
2013 deaths
1925 births
Writers from New York City
People from Port Jefferson, New York
American Episcopal priests
People from Shelter Island, New York
Columbia College (New York) alumni
20th-century American Episcopalians